3rd TFCA Awards
December 16, 1999

Best Film: 
 Magnolia 
The 3rd Toronto Film Critics Association Awards, honoring the best in film for 1999, were held on 16 December 1999.

Winners
Best Actor:
Kevin Spacey – American Beauty
Runner-Up: Jim Carrey – Man on the Moon

Best Actress:
Hilary Swank – Boys Don't Cry
Runner-Up: Cecilia Roth – All About My Mother

Best Canadian Film: 
Set Me Fre
Runner-Up: Felicia's Journey

Best Director: 
Paul Thomas Anderson – Magnolia
Runners-Up: Sam Mendes – American Beauty and Steven Soderbergh – The Limey

Best Film: 
Magnolia
Runner-Up: Being John Malkovich

Best Screenplay (tie): 
Being John Malkovich – Charlie Kaufman
Magnolia – Paul Thomas Anderson
Runner-Up: American Beauty – Alan Ball

Clyde Gilmour Award: 
Elwy Yost

References

1999
1999 film awards
1999 in Toronto
1999 in Canadian cinema